The International Association for Engineering Geology and the Environment, formerly International Association for Engineering Geology, also known as IAEG, is an international scientific society which was founded in 1964. It is affiliated with the International Union of Geological Sciences (IUGS) and has 3,798 members and 59 national groups all over the world.

The association aims to promote and encourage the advancement of engineering geology through technological activities and research. At the same time it strives to improve teaching and training in engineering geology, and to collect, evaluate and disseminate the results of engineering geological activities. Together with Springer Science+Business Media, it publishes the Bulletin of Engineering Geology and the Environment.

The first president of the IAEG was Asher Shadmon, who held the office from 1964 to 1968. The current president is Rafig Azzam from Aachen University of Technology.

Every two years, the IAEG awards the Hans Cloos medal to an engineering geologist of outstanding merit. Every four years, the IAEG organizes an international congress, during which a general meeting of the association takes place and the board for the subsequent four years is also elected. The XII IAEG Congress was held in Turin (Italy) in September 2014. The XIII IAEG Congress will be held in San Francisco (California, USA), in September 2018, and will also serve as the 61st annual meeting of the Association of Environmental & Engineering Geologists.

IAEG is a member of the Federation of International Geo-Engineering Societies (FedIGS).

History

The birth of the IAEG 
During the XXII International Geological Congress (IGS) in New Delhi, on 12 December 1964, the Israeli geologist Asher Shadmon remarked that "quarry materials and mineral products used in engineering" were not being discussed and proposed that the IUGS should create and fund an international permanent commission dedicated to that topic. Other geologists at the congress suggested that the commission should cover also the relationship between the materials in their natural place and the work of engineers.

On 17 December the assembly voted the following motion unanimously: "It is recommended that a distinct Commission of "Engineering Geology" should be established in the context of International Geological Congresses.[…] The objective of the Commission and its Sub-commissions would be to promote the knowledge and dissemination of appropriate information, gather ´case-histories´, prepare literature reviews and relevant catalogues, provide information on completed or ongoing research, gather statistical geological data on the industries and determine the list of further research required".

On 19 December, although the interest in engineering geology was high, due to scarcity of resources that did not allow to support a new permanent commission, the executive committee of the IUGS proposed to create a small committee, headed by Shadmon, in charge of producing and presenting a report on the state of the situation by contacting the International Society for Soil Mechanics and the International Society for Rock Mechanics, as well as existing national societies of engineering geology.

However, on 21 December the delegates decided to immediately hold a new session during which the International Association for Engineering Geology (IAEG) was unanimously created. Besides Asher Shadmon, the founding members were Marcel Arnould (France), G. Bain (USA), M.S. Balasundaram (India), L.M.C. Calembert (Belgium), R.S. Chaturvedi (India), G.C. Chowdhary (India), E. Beneo (Italy), K. Erguvanli (Turkey), A. Hamza (India), M.S. Jain (India), L.E. Kent (South Africa), V.S. Krishnaswamy (India), J.D.S. Lakshmaman (France), A.R. Mahendra (India), M. Manfredi (Italy), V. Prasad (India), B. Ramchandran (India), J.Th. Rosenqvist (Norway), B. Sanatkumar (India), P.B. Srinivasan (India), L.S. Srivastava (India) and M. Zapata (Spain). They elected a provisional committee to steer the initial activity.

The first years 
At the beginning, the association worked on enhancing the provisional committee to gain full international representation. By the end of 1966, the committee was composed as follows: Asher Shadmon (Israel), as president; Marcel Arnould (France), as Secretary; E. Beneo (Italy); V.S. Krishnaswamy, R.S. Mithal and M.S. Balasundaram (India); K. Erguvanli (Turkey); A.M. Hull (USA), president of the American Association of Engineering Geologist; E.M. Sergeev and N.V. Kolomenskij (USSR); Quido Záruba (Czechoslovakia); M.D. Ruiz (Brazil); G. Champetier de Ribes (France), as Treasurer. Discussions to join the IAEG were still ongoing with representatives of Australia, Japan and Mexico.

During the first two years the first statutes were established and a programme of the activities was defined. The purposes and goals of the association were defined as follows: "Article 1: The scope of engineering geology covers the applications of earth sciences to engineering, planning, construction, prospecting, testing and processing of related materials"; "Article 2: The aims of the IAEG are to encourage research, training and dissemination of knowledge by developing the international cooperation in its relation to engineering".

At the 1967 meeting of the IUGS, a request of affiliation of the IAEG to the IUGS was presented and accepted by the executive committee. The decision was ratified unanimously by the general assembly of the IUGS on 23 August 1968 in Prague.

The first general assembly 
The input from the Czechoslovakian engineering geologist has been noticeable in the first years, especially that of Quido Záruba and Jaroslav Pasek. They were together responsible for organizing a section on engineering geology at the XXIII International Geological Congress (IGC) in Prague in 1968, at which they shared the aims of the IAEG. They also organised the first scientific symposium of the IAEG in Brno (Czechoslovakia), from 26 to 27 April 1968 and a second symposium during the IGC on "Engineering geology and land planning".

The first general assembly was held on 23 August 1968 in Prague during the XXIII IGC. At the time of the congress, the country was deeply affected by the movement of soviet troops. Nevertheless, the general assembly went ahead and the statutes were ratified and an executive committee was elected for a period of four years to replace the provisional committee.

The new committee was composed as follows: Quido Záruba (Czechoslovakia), President; Marcel Arnould (France), Secretary General; G. Champetier de Ribes (France), Treasurer; Asher Shadmon (Israel), Past President; L. Calembert (Belgium), Vice-president for Europe; L. Cluff (USA), Vice-president for North America; M.D. Ruiz (Brazil), Vice-president for South America; L. Oborn (New Zealand), vice president for Australasia; H. Tanaka (Japan), Vice-president for Asia; a representative from Ghana as vice-president for Africa. Other members: N.V. Kolomenskij (USSR); A Nemock (Czechoslovakia); J. Janjic (Yugoslavia); R. Glossop (United Kingdom); A. Drucker (Federal Republic of Germany); J.M. Crepeau (Canada).

In addition to the executive committee, three "working groups" were established:

 Landslides, under the responsibility of J. Pasek (Czechoslovakia);
 Soluble rocks, under the responsibility of F. Reuter (East Germany) and K. Erguvanli (Turkey);
 Geotechnical mapping, under the responsibility of M. Matula (Czechoslovakia).

Finally, it was decided to organize future congresses specifically for the IAEG and to hold these alternately with the International Geological Congresses, which means that both events would take place every four years but the IAEG would have a congress with a general assembly every two years and scientific symposia in the years in between.

The first congresses with general assemblies were as follows:

 New Delhi (India) XXII IGC in 1964
 Prague (Czechoslovakia) XXIII IGC in 1968; 
 Paris (France) 1st IAEG congress in 1970.

The Bulletin of the IAEG 
The first elected executive committee decided in their second meeting at the UNESCO Palace in Paris (May 1969) to create a journal of the IAEG, to be edited and published by the Association and called the Bulletin of the IAEG (full name: "Bulletin of the International Association of Engineering Geology - Bulletin de l'Association Internationale de Géologie de l'Ingénieur").

The first edition of the Bulletin was distributed during the first IAEG congress in September 1970 in Paris. This was possible thanks to the personal efforts of Quido Záruba, the IAEG president, J. Pasek, Marcel Arnould and several other staff from the Paris School of Mines. Starting as a simple artisanal publication, the Bulletin became a scientific reference among the most respected journals in the fields of engineering geology, the environment and other geosciences, and "the official journal of the IAEG". It is now published by Springer Science+Business Media and edited by the Association, and goes with the title Bulletin of Engineering Geology and the Environment.

The second statutes 
As a result of the progressive involvement of engineering geologists in consulting, in the study, design, construction and supervision of large projects and in the assessment and remediation of environmental issues, an update of the first statutes of the association was deemed necessary. The second statutes were approved by the general assembly in Kyoto (Japan) in 1992.

A new definition of engineering geology was given, which reflected the experience collected during the previous 25 years and read as follows: "Engineering geology is a science devoted to the investigation, study and solution of engineering and environmental problems which may arise as the result of the interaction between geology and the works and activities of man as well as to the prediction of and the development of measures for prevention or remediation of geologic hazards. Engineering geology embraces: the definition of geomorphology, structure, stratigraphy, lithology and groundwater conditions of geological formations; the characterization of the mineralogical, physico-geomechanical, chemical and hydraulic properties of all earth materials involved in construction, resource recovery and environmental change; the assessment of the mechanical and hydrologic behaviour of soil and rock masses; the prediction of changes to the above properties with time; the determination of the parameters to be considered in the stability analysis of engineering works and of earth masses; and the improvement and maintenance of the environmental condition and of the properties of the terrain".

Members 
As of May 2018, the IAEG has 3,798 members divided as follows:

 North America - 204 members;
 South America - 102 members;
 Europe - 1848 members;
 Africa - 172 members;
 Asia - 798 members;
 Australasia - 684 members.

The IAEG has 59 national groups (+1 for the territory of Chinese Taipei):

Congresses 
Following is a list of the international congresses of the IAEG, which are held every four years. Since 1998, the congresses have a main theme, which is reflected in the denomination of the event.

 1970  Paris, 1st IAEG Congress
 1974  São Paulo, 2nd IAEG Congress
 1978  Madrid, 3rd IAEG Congress
 1982  New Delhi, 4th IAEG Congress
 1986  Buenos Aires, 5th IAEG Congress
 1990  Amsterdam, 6th IAEG Congress
 1994  Lisbon, 7th IAEG Congress
 1998  Vancouver, 8th IAEG Congress, "A global view from the Pacific Rim"
 2002  Durban, 9th IAEG Congress, "Engineering geology for developing countries"
 2006  Nottingham, 10th IAEG Congress, "Engineering geology for tomorrow's cities"
 2010  Auckland, 11th IAEG Congress, "Geologically active"
 2014  Turin, 12th IAEG Congress, "Engineering geology for society and territory"
 2018  San Francisco, 13th IAEG Congress, "Engineering geology for a sustainable world"
 2023, Chengdu, 14th IAEG Congress

The IAEG organizes also regional conferences. So far, Asian regional conferences and European regional conferences have been held.

European regional conferences 

 2004  Liège, 1st European regional conference, "Professional practices and engineering geological methods"
 2008  Madrid, 2nd European regional conference, "Cities and their underground environment"
 2021  Athens, 3rd European regional conference, "Leading to Innovative Engineering Geology Practices"

Asian regional conferences 

 1997  Tokyo, 1st Asian regional conference, "Dam geology"
 1999  Bangi, 2nd Asian regional conference, "Engineering geology: Planning for sustainable development"
 2001  Yogyakarta, 3rd Asian regional conference, "Natural resources management for regional development in tropical area"
 2004  Hong Kong, 4th Asian regional conference, "Engineering geology for sustainable development in mountainous areas"
 2005    Kathmandu,5th Asian regional conference, "Engineering geology, hydrology, and natural disasters"
 2007  Seoul, 6th Asian regional conference, "Geohazard in engineering geology"
 2009  Chengdu, 7th Asian regional conference, "Geological engineering problems in major construction projects"
 2011  Bangalore, 8th Asian regional conference, "Underground space technology"
 2013  Beijing, 9th Asian regional conference, "Global view of engineering geology and the environment"
 2015  Kyoto, 10th Asian regional conference, "Geohazards and engineering geology"
 2017    Kathmandu, 11th Asian regional conference, "Engineering geology for geodisaster management'
 2019  Jeju, 12th Asian regional conference

References

External links 

 Official website of the International Association for Engineering Geology and the Environment
 The Bulletin of Engineering Geology and the Environment
 Federation of International Geo-Engineering Societies

Geology organizations
Geology societies
International environmental organizations
Association for Engineering Geology and the Environment
Association for Engineering Geology and the Environment
Scientific organizations established in 1964